The Dr. A.M. Brown House is a house in Birmingham, Alabama, built . It was designed by W.A. Rayfield, one of the first African-American architects in Alabama for Dr. Arthur McKinnon Brown, one of the first African-American physicians in Birmingham.

The house is a -story bungalow-style building with a deep porch across the front and sides supported by rusticated concrete block pillars. The ground floor walls are constructed in a similar fashion. A broad front dormer has a balcony projecting forward with a small pediment over the entrance.

The Brown House was placed on the National Register of Historic Places on June 20, 1974.

References

External links
 

Houses on the National Register of Historic Places in Alabama
Houses in Birmingham, Alabama
Historic American Buildings Survey in Alabama
National Register of Historic Places in Birmingham, Alabama
1908 establishments in Alabama
Houses completed in 1908